Solar power in Cyprus is more available than in almost all of the rest of the Europe. 

In 2010, Solar heating per capita in Cyprus was the highest among all European countries, with 611 W per capita.

The EAC (Electricity Authority of Cyprus) reported that 2,196 households installed rooftop solar panels in the first 7 months of 2020, despite the global COVID-19 pandemic and the associated financial, economic, and social disturbance. Whilst this is on track to be the highest number of installations in a year (previously it was 5,083 systems installed in 2014), 2020 is also set to smash the previous record for added capacity, which currently sits at 15.3MW. This record was also achieved in 2014.  

The total number of households with photovoltaics sits at 16,546 as of September 2020. The solar energy and installation companies can be found in all of the major cities throughout the island, including Nicosia (the capital), Limassol, Larnaca, Famagusta and Paphos.

Government targets
In 2011, the Cypriot target of solar power including both photovoltaics and concentrated solar power was a combined 7% of electricity by 2020.

Despite the seemingly optimistic outlook for solar power in Cyprus, the overall government response to the EU's Renewable Energy Directive has been less than stellar. Cyprus’ National Energy and Climate Plan for the period 2021-2030 was sent back a number of times as being inadequate. There have also been claims from government officials about fudging data in order to meet the RES targets for 2020.

Largest PV power plants

See also

Energy in Cyprus
List of renewable energy topics by country
Renewable energy in Cyprus
Solar power in the European Union
Renewable energy by country

References

External links